David Cecil, 3rd Earl of Exeter (c. 1600–1643) was an English peer and member of the House of Lords.

Life
David Cecil was the son of Sir Richard Cecil of Wakerley, Northamptonshire. He was educated at Clare College, Cambridge, and admitted at Lincoln's Inn in 1627. In 1640, he sat for Peterborough in the Short Parliament. He inherited the earldom in July 1640 from his uncle William Cecil, 2nd Earl of Exeter.

He married Elizabeth Egerton (d. 1688), daughter of John Egerton, 1st Earl of Bridgewater. Their daughter, Lady Frances Cecil (1633–1652), married Anthony Ashley Cooper, 1st Earl of Shaftesbury. He was succeeded by his son John Cecil, 4th Earl of Exeter.

References

http://thepeerage.com/p1636.htm#i16351

1600s births
1643 deaths
17th-century English nobility
Barons Burghley
Earls of Exeter
David Cecil, 3rd Earl of Exeter
Cecil, David